Jagmo, born Nels Jacobson, is a US artist and poster art historian born in Chicago in 1949. He moved to Austin, Texas in 1978 and began creating rock posters in 1981. For three years during the early 1980s Jacobson served as bar manager and promotional director for Austin’s Club Foot. He has designed posters for live-music venues such as Liberty Lunch, Cain's Ballroom and The Fillmore, and for performers such as Stevie Ray Vaughan, the Ramones, Divine, Roky Erickson, Etta James, Dead Kennedys, the B-52's, Bonnie Raitt, Joe Ely, Los Lobos, the Pixies, Iggy Pop, Willie Nelson, Fela Kuti, Jimmie Dale Gilmore and Jerry Jeff Walker. In 1987, Jacobson helped organize the Texas-U.S.S.R. Musicians' Exchange tour of the Soviet Union and accompanied the performers to Leningrad, Moscow and Kyiv. He was art director for South by Southwest (SXSW) during its first six years, designing the original logo, and in 1998 founded the SXSW Continuing Legal Education program, which he continues to oversee in 2019. Jacobson has served on the packaging Grammy Award committees for the Texas and San Francisco chapters of the National Academy of Recording Arts and Sciences, and is a founding Director of the American Poster Institute and the South Austin Museum of Popular Culture, and a board member of The Rock Poster Society (TRPS).

Selected writings
"Art Laws and Outlaws: Legal Issues in Music Graphics" from SXSW 2015 (course materials for Continuing Legal Education Program)  Art Laws and Outlaws

Introductory essay "Colorful Tales and Early Techniques" in Homegrown: Austin Music Posters, 1967 to 1982 (Alan Schaefer, ed., University of Texas Press 2015) 

"Art of Rock and Roll" from the 24th Annual Entertainment Law Institute course book (TexasBarCLE and the Entertainment and Sports Law Section of the State Bar of Texas 2014)

Introduction to chapter about Flatstock 4 in Rock Poster Show: Flatstock Volume One (Soundscreen Design 2010) 

“Rock Music Posters and the Law” from Entertainment and Sports Lawyer Volume 23/Number 1 (American Bar Association Spring 2005)   http://www.jagmo.com/articles/Posters_Law.pdf

”Foreword,” with Dirk Fowler, to Swag 2: Rock Posters of the '90s and Beyond by Spencer Drate and Judith Salavetz, (Harry N. Abrams, Inc. 2005) 

“Armadillos, Peccadillos, and the Maverick Posterists of Austin, Texas” from Prints and Printmakers of Texas: Proceedings of the Twentieth Annual North American Print Conference (Ron Tyler ed., Texas State Historical Association 1997) 

“Faith, Hope & Parody: Campbell v. Acuff-Rose, ‘Oh, Pretty Woman,’ and Parodists' Rights” from the
Houston Law Review Volume 31/Number 3 (1994) 

"The Maverick Tradition: Postering in Austin, Texas, Part II" from OFFtheWALL Volume No. 1/Issue No. 3 (1992)  http://www.jagmo.com/articles/index.html

"The Maverick Tradition: Postering in Austin, Texas, Part I" from OFFtheWALL Volume No. 1/Issue No. 2 (1991)  http://www.jagmo.com/articles/index.html

“Austin Poster Art” from The Austin Chronicle Vol. III/No.23 (July 13, 1984) 

"The Request" (a poem) from Rolling Stone Issue No. 292 (May 31, 1979)

References
"Putting Images to Music: The Poster Design of Nels Jacobson" by Luke Torn from SXSWORLD (March 2017) 

"Legal Panels Celebrate 20 Years at SXSW" from SXSWORLD (March 2017) 

Homegrown: Austin Music Posters, 1967 to 1982 (Alan Schaefer, ed., University of Texas Press 2015) 

Rock Poster Art by Didier Maiffredy (Groupe Eyrolles 2013) 

"Nels Jacobson (Jagmo): Music for Eyes" by Michalis Limnios for Blues.Gr (March 10, 2016) http://blues.gr

A Fistful of Rock & Roll: Real Rock for Real Rock Bands by Sal Canzonieri (BGT ENT 2013) 

Rock Poster Show: Flatstock Volume One (Soundscreen Design 2010) 

Swag 2: Rock Posters of the '90s and Beyond by Spencer Drate and Judith Salavetz, (Harry N. Abrams, Inc. 2005) 

Art of Modern Rock by Paul Grushkin and Dennis King (Chronicle Books 2004) 

“Art Rock: Nels ‘Jagmo’ Jacobson” by Patty Gopez for The Live Buzz (October 7, 2010)

“Poster Art: Nels ‘Jagmo’ Jacobson's fortuitous relocation” by Liza Rush from Design Bureau by Alarm Press (June 23, 2010)  http://alarmpress.com

“60 Concert Posters from Ten Amazing Artists” by Robert Bowen from Smashing Magazine (September 28, 2008)  http://www.smashingmagazine.com

“Concert Poster Art: Austin, Texas Style” by Rush Evans from Discoveries Issue 94 (March 1996) 

“A portrait of Austin’s past: Posters depict musical history since 1960s” by Pete Szilagyi from the Austin-American Statesman (July 4, 1992) 

“Tradition and Texas posters: ‘Jagmo’ fills the space between art, ads” by Don McLeese from the Austin-American Statesman (September 19, 1991) 

“Signs of the Times” by Jill Becker from Texas Monthly (June 1991) 

“Ten Days that Shook My World: Part II Kiev: On John Lennon’s Birthday” by Tom Chamberlain from Current: San Antonio’s Newsweekly (November 19–25, 1987)

“Ten Days that Shook My World: Part I Leningrad: City that Peter the Great Built” by Tom Chamberlain from Current: San Antonio’s Newsweekly (November 12–18, 1987)

“Local artists to act as ambassadors of good music” by Michael Point from the Austin-American Statesman (September 24, 1987) 

“An Artist Against Apartheid” by Greg Stephens from The Austin Chronicle (August 15, 1986)

External links
Jagmo.com
Books by Nels Jacobson
South Austin Popular Culture Center
Flatstock during SXSW 2012 (video by Niama and Evelyn of Society HAE)

1949 births
American illustrators
American poster artists
American art historians
Artists from Austin, Texas
Living people
Historians from Texas